Caenurgia runica is a species of moth of the family Erebidae. It is found in Chile and Argentina.

References

Moths described in 1874
Caenurgia
Moths of South America